Lakuri is a village development committee in Dailekh District in the Bheri Zone of western-central Nepal. At the time of the 1991 Nepal census it had a population of 3234 people living in 573 individual households.

Media 
To Promote local culture Lakuri has one FM radio station Radio Dhrubatara F.M. - 89.8 MHz Which is a Community radio Station.

References

External links
UN map of the municipalities of Dailekh District

Populated places in Dailekh District